Menzies is a Scottish surname, with Gaelic forms being Méinnearach and Méinn, and other variant forms being Menigees, Mennes, Mengzes, Menzeys, Mengies, and Minges.

Derivation and history 
The name and its Gaelic form are probably derived from the Norman name Mesnières, from the town of Mesnières-en-Bray in Normandy.

Pronunciation 
The name is traditionally pronounced — and still is in Scotland —  . The current spelling arose when the similar-looking tailed variant of the letter  (i.e.) was used as a substitute for the now obsolete letter  (yogh) in the Scots language. However, outside Scotland it is often erroneously given the spelling-pronunciation  . A Scottish limerick plays on the traditional, correct pronunciation:

There wis a young lassie named Menzies,
That askit her aunt whit this thenzies.
Said her aunt wi a gasp,
"Ma dear, it's a wasp,
An you're haudin the end whaur the stenzies!"

The second and fifth lines are pronounced as though the <z> were a <>, making "thing is" and "sting is", to rhyme with "Menzies". "Wasp" rhymes with "gasp" in Scots.

As a surname 
 Alan W. C. Menzies, Scots-born chemist and professor of Chemistry at Princeton University
 Alex Menzies, Scottish football player
 Alex Menzies (footballer, born 1882), Scottish international football player
 Archibald Menzies (1754–1842), British medic and biologist; ship's doctor and naturalist on board George Vancouver's voyage to the North Pacific
Beryl Menzies (married name Beryl Fowler, 1881–1963), English painter
 Charles Menzies, anthropologist
 Charles Menzies (1783–1866), Royal Marines officer
 Danni Menzies, British presenter of A Place in the Sun
 David Menzies, Canadian journalist
 Douglas Menzies, former Justice of the High Court of Australia
 Sir Frederick Menzies, British physician
 Gavin Menzies, retired British submarine captain and author
 George Menzies, New Zealand rugby league footballer
 Gina Menzies, Irish media personality
 Heather Menzies (1949–2017), Canadian actress
 Henry Menzies (1867–1938), Scottish rugby player
 Hugh Menzies (1857–1925), Australian politician
 Ivan Menzies (1896–1985), singer and actor
 James Menzies, New Zealand politician
 James Menzies (Wisconsin politician) (1830–1913), American politician
 John Menzies, businessman
 John A. Menzies, Manitoba judge
 John K. Menzies, former US-Bosnian ambassador and academic
 Karen Menzies (born 1962), Australian footballer
 Karl Menzies, Australian cyclist
 Mark Menzies, Scottish Conservative MP
 Neal Menzies, Australian Professor of Soil Science
 Peter Menzies Jr., Australian cinematographer
 Sir Robert Menzies (1894-1978), Australia's longest-serving Prime Minister, who pronounced his own name in the Scottish fashion
 Sadie Menzies (1914–1996), founder member of the Revolutionary Workers Group 
 Steve Menzies, Australian rugby league player
 Stewart Menzies, Head of British Secret Intelligence Service 1939–1952
 Ted Menzies, Canadian politician (MP)
 Tobias Menzies, British actor
 William Cameron Menzies (1896–1957), American film director

As a given name 
 Iain Menzies Banks, Scottish writer, penname used for his science fiction works
 Walter Menzies Campbell, former leader of the Liberal Democrats in the United Kingdom

See also 

 Clan Menzies, Scottish clan
 Mingus (disambiguation), pronounced similarly

Footnotes

References 

Scottish surnames
Scottish masculine given names